Vingtaine Bas de la Vallée is one of the six vingtaines of St Lawrence Parish on the Channel Island of Jersey.

References 

Vingtaines of Jersey
Saint Lawrence, Jersey
Jersey articles needing attention